Arbelodes prochesi is a moth in the family Cossidae. It is found in south-central Zambia and on the Eastern Highlands of Zimbabwe, possibly extending into Mozambique. The habitat consists of legume-dominated woodland.

The length of the forewings is about 12 mm.

Etymology
The species is named in honour of Dr Serban Proches.

References

Natural History Museum Lepidoptera generic names catalog

Moths described in 2010
Metarbelinae